Pierina Sue Wong Mori is a Peruvian beauty pageant titleholder who won the 2016 edition of Miss Peru. She represented her country at the Miss World 2016 pageant, but did not enter the finals.

Pageantry

At 23 years of age, Wong competed in the 2013 edition of Miss Perú Tusán|es, held on October 26, 2013, in the city of Lima. She won the contest and was crowned by the outgoing titleholder, Andrea Paz.

On December 5, 2015, Wong represented the department of Lambayeque in the national Miss World Peru 2016 contest, held at the Plaza de Armas of Trujillo. She won the title and was crowned by the outgoing titleholder, Karla Chocano.

References

External links
 
 

1990 births
Living people
People from Chiclayo
Peruvian people of Chinese descent
Peruvian beauty pageant winners
Peruvian female models
Miss World 2016 delegates